Potassium bisulfite (or potassium hydrogen sulfite) is a chemical mixture with the approximate chemical formula KHSO3. Potassium bisulfite in fact is not a real compound, but a mixture of salts that dissolve in water to give solutions composed of potassium ions and bisulfite ions.  It is a white solid with an odor of sulfur dioxide. Attempts to crystallize potassium bisulfite yield potassium metabisulfite, K2S2O5.

Potassium bisulfite is used as a sterilising agent in the production of alcoholic beverages.   This additive is classified as E number E228 under the current EU-approved food additive legislation.

Production
It is made by the reaction of sulfur dioxide and potassium carbonate.  The sulfur dioxide is passed through a solution of the potassium carbonate until no more carbon dioxide is evolved.  The solution is concentrated.

See also
 Calcium bisulfite
 Sodium bisulfite

References

Potassium compounds
Bisulfites
Food additives
E-number additives